= Shooting at the 2010 South American Games – Men's trap automatic =

The Men's automatic trap event at the 2010 South American Games was held on March 20 and March 21 at 9:00.

== Individual ==
=== Medalists ===
Gold	Silver	Bronze
Cesar David Flores; Bolivia	Francisco Juan Dibos; Peru	Juan Carlos Gacha; Bolivia

=== Results ===
Rank	Athlete	Series					Total	Shoot-off
Rank	Athlete	1	2	3	4	5	Total	Shoot-off
1st place, gold medalist(s)	Cesar David Flores (BOL)	21	24	23	25	24	117	
2nd place, silver medalist(s)	Francisco Juan Dibos (PER)	23	23	22	22	24	114	
3rd place, bronze medalist(s)	Juan Carlos Gacha (BOL)	22	22	23	21	24	112	
4	Oscar Haddad Garcia (COL)	23	23	23	20	22	111	4
5	Asier Josu Parodi (PER)	24	22	23	22	20	111	3
6	Mario Soarez (VEN)	23	22	23	20	23	111	0
7	Jose Antonio Saavedra (CHI)	21	24	19	18	22	104	
8	Michel Daou (AHO)	21	21	18	21	22	103	
9	Pablo Antonio Massaro (CHI)	21	18	21	22	21	103	
10	Humberto Oliveiro (VEN)	20	21	19	21	20	101	
11	Jose Ignacio Sierra (COL)	19	19	21	19	22	100	

== Team ==
=== Medalists ===
Gold	Silver	Bronze
Cesar David Flores; Juan Carlos Gacha; Bolivia	Francisco Juan Dibos; Asier Josu Parodi; Peru	Mario Soarez; Humberto Oliveiro; Venezuela

=== Results ===
Rank	Athlete	Series					Total
Rank	Athlete	1	2	3	4	5	Total
1st place, gold medalist(s)	Bolivia						229
1st place, gold medalist(s)	Cesar David Flores (BOL)	21	24	23	25	24	117
1st place, gold medalist(s)	Juan Carlos Gacha (BOL)	22	22	23	21	24	112
2nd place, silver medalist(s)	Peru						225
2nd place, silver medalist(s)	Francisco Juan Dibos (PER)	23	23	22	22	24	114
2nd place, silver medalist(s)	Asier Josu Parodi (PER)	24	22	23	22	20	111
3rd place, bronze medalist(s)	Venezuela						212
3rd place, bronze medalist(s)	Mario Soarez (VEN)	23	22	23	20	23	111
3rd place, bronze medalist(s)	Humberto Oliveiro (VEN)	20	21	19	21	20	101
4	Colombia						211
4	Oscar Haddad Garcia (COL)	23	23	23	20	22	111
4	Jose Ignacio Sierra (COL)	19	19	21	19	22	100
5	Chile						207
5	Jose Antonio Saavedra (CHI)	21	24	19	18	22	104
5	Pablo Antonio Massaro (CHI)	21	18	21	22	21	103
